The Max Planck Institute for Dynamics of Complex Technical Systems is a German research institute of Engineering in Magdeburg, focusing on Dynamics.
The institute was founded in 1996 and belongs to the Max Planck Society.

Notes and references

External links 
 

Dynamics of Complex Technical Systems

Systems science institutes